Mekmen Ben Amar (Arabic: مكمن بن عمار) is a municipality in Naâma Province, Algeria. It is the district seat the district of Mekmen Ben Amar and has a population of 3,658, which gives it 7 seats in the PMA. Its postal code is 45120 and its municipal code is 4510.

Populated places in Naâma Province